Corypha umbraculifera, the talipot palm, is a species of palm native to eastern and southern India and Sri Lanka. It is also grown in Cambodia, Myanmar, China, Thailand and the Andaman Islands. It is a flowering plant with the largest inflorescence in the world. It lives up to 60 years before bearing flowers and fruits. It dies shortly after.

Description

The talipot palm is monocarpic, flowering only once, when it is 30 to 80 years old. It takes about a year for the fruit to mature, producing thousands of round, yellow-green fruit  in diameter, each containing a single seed. The plant dies after fruiting.

Distribution
The talipot palm is cultivated in South India and Sri Lanka. It is also cultivated in Southeast Asian countries of Cambodia, Myanmar, Thailand and the Andaman Islands. It is also grown sparsely in China.

Uses
Historically, the leaves were written upon in various South Asian and South-East Asian cultures using an iron stylus to create palm leaf manuscripts. In the Philippines, it is locally known as buri or buli. The leaves are also used for thatching, and the sap is tapped to make palm wine. In South India, the palm leaves are used to make umbrellas for agricultural workers. The tree is known as kudapana (കുടപ്പന) in Malayalam, talo (ତାଳ) in Odia, sreetalam (శ్రీతాళం) in Telugu and kudaipanai (குடைப்பனை) in Tamil, which means umbrella palm. The plant is known as tala (තල) in Sri Lanka, by local Sinhalese people.

In Cambodia, the palm is known as tréang (it was also known by the French name latanier), and as noted above was extensively used in the past to write religious manunscripts. In recent times the leaf media has been used by traditional healers and soothsayers. The mature leaves are used to make thatches, mats and hats. The petioles can be used in the manufacture of canes, arrows and netting needles. At low tide, fishers use the fruit to stupefy fish.

Gallery

See also
Ola leaf

References

PACSOA: Corypha umbraculifera

External links

umbraculifera
Data deficient plants
Flora of the Indian subcontinent
Plants described in 1753
Taxa named by Carl Linnaeus